Sinheungsa, sometimes spelled Shinheungsa, is a head temple of the Jogye Order of Korean Buddhism.  It is situated on the slopes of Seoraksan in Sokcho, Gangwon Province, South Korea.

Sinheungsa is located in Seoraksan National Park, and many tourists hiking Seoraksan up to Ulsanbawi (peak) pass by the temple on the way. Other temples with the name Sinheungsa are located in Seoul, Samcheok and Icheon.

Origins

Historical accounts vary as to whether this ancient Zen (Seon) temple was first constructed by Jajang in 653, first called Hyangseongsa (Temple of Zen Buddhism), or in 637 following his return from Tang China.  It burned to the ground in 699, was rebuilt in 710, burned again in 1645 and was rebuilt in 1648 at its present location by Uisang.  This temple is believed to be the oldest Zen (Seon) temple in the world.

Bronze Buddha

The Great Unification Buddha, a 14.6-meter/48-foot, 108 ton gilt-bronze Buddha statue, called "Tongil Daebul", sits atop a 4.3-meter/15-foot high pedestal, of the same material, making the total height 18.9-meter/62-foot, excluding the lightning rod and nimbus.

The lotus pedestal is flanked with 16 delicately engraved panels and the forehead of Tongil Daebul is adorned with eight 8-centimeter/3-inch stones of amber, with a single piece of jade in the center that is 10-centimeter/4-inch in diameter.

Tongil Daebul sits with legs crossed and half-closed eyes in meditation, his lips displaying a perceptible smile. A flowing robe with gentle folds, revealing the right shoulder, drapes the Buddha's robust torso. The hands of Tongil Daebul are positioned in the mudra symbolizing the "enlightened one."

Contained within the hollow statue are three pieces of the Buddha's sari, remains collected after his cremation, donated by the Myanmar government, and the Tripitaka, the original Buddhist scriptures.

The project to construct this statue of the Buddha cost 3.8 billion won ($4.1 million), raised through the contributions for over a decade from over 300,000 small donations from anonymous donors visiting the temple.

This statue represents the crucial wish of the Korean people for the reunification of the divided country.

Gallery

See also
Korean Buddhist temples
Korean Buddhism
Religion in South Korea

References

External links
Official site, in Korean
KoreaTemple profile

Religious organizations established in the 7th century
Buddhist temples in South Korea
Buildings and structures in Gangwon Province, South Korea
Buddhist temples of the Jogye Order
Sokcho
Tourist attractions in Gangwon Province, South Korea